The Evansville Thunder were a professional basketball team who played in Evansville, Indiana, from 1984 to 1986. The team was a member of the Continental Basketball Association and played at Roberts Municipal Stadium. Evansville had previous experience with  professional basketball when it was home to the Evansville Agogans of the National Professional Basketball League from 1950 to 1951. The Thunder hired soon-to-be Utah Jazz head coach and University of Evansville alumnus Jerry Sloan to coach the team in 1984, but Sloan left to become an assistant coach for the Utah Jazz prior to coaching any Thunder games.

All-time roster

Marvin Barnes
Micah Blunt
Clyde Bradshaw
Theran Bullock
Carlos Clark
Mike Clark
Rod Drake
Derrick Gervin
Claude Gregory
Kenny Higgs
Chris Hughes
Albert Irving
Clay Johnson
Greg Jones
Harold Keeling
Donnie Koonce
Kevin Loder
Tony Martin
Carl Mitchell
Kenny Perry
Lorenzo Romar
DeWayne Scales
Kevin Smith
Clarence Tillman

Sources

Season-by-season standings

See also
 Sports in Evansville
 List of developmental and minor sports leagues

References

Continental Basketball Association teams
Basketball teams in Indiana
Basketball in Evansville, Indiana
Basketball teams established in 1984
Sports clubs disestablished in 1986
1984 establishments in Indiana
1986 disestablishments in Indiana